This is a list of libraries in Spain.

National libraries
 National Library of Spain

Autonomous community libraries 
 Andalusia Library
 Aragon Library
 Asturias Library
 Central Library of Cantabria
 Castile and Leon Library
 Castile-La Mancha Library
 Library of Catalonia
 Extremadura Library
 Library of Galicia
 La Rioja Library
 Madrid Regional Library
 Murcia Regional Library
 Navarre Library
 Valencian Library

Public libraries

Andalusia 
 Almería Public Library
 Cádiz Public Library
 Córdoba Public Library
 Granada Public Library
 Huelva Public Library
 Jaén Public Library
 Málaga Public Library
 Seville Public Library
Jerez Central Public Library (es)
Algeciras Municipal Library

Catalonia 
 Lleida Public Library

Valencian Community 
 Public Library of Valencia

Other 
 Toledo Public Library (Spain)

University libraries 
 University of Santiago de Compostela Library
 University of Salamanca Library
 University of Barcelona Library
 University of Seville Library
 University of Valladolid Library

Other libraries
 Escorial Library

See also 
 Books in Spain
 List of libraries
 List of libraries in Barcelona
 List of archives in Spain
 List of museums in Spain
 Open access in Spain

Bibliography

External links 
 Public Libraries directory

 
Spain
Libraries
Libraries